The 2020–21 season was Football Club Prishtina's 21st consecutive season in the top flight of Kosovar football.  In addition to the domestic league, Prishtina will participate in this season's editions of the Kosovar Cup, the Kosovar Supercup, and the UEFA Europa League. This season covers the period from July 2020 to June 2021.

Season overview

July and August
On 31 July 2020, Albanian midfielder Ardit Hila resigned.

On 5 August 2020, Pristina loaned only for European competition matches from Trepça'89, the former Kosovo U21 midfielder Muharrem Jashari.

On 6 August 2020, Prishtina announced the departure of Labinot Ibrahimi and Ergyn Ahmeti.

On 7 August 2020, Prishtina announced were three footballers and four members of the team staff tested positive for coronavirus.

On 8 August 2020, Prishtina announced the signing of Besnik Krasniqi from Ballkani.

On 9 August 2020, the draw for Europa League was held and Prishtina were drawn against Gibraltarian side Lincoln Red Imps.

On 10 August 2020, Prishtina announced the signing of Behar Maliqi from Llapi. The following day on 11 August, Prishtina announced the signing of Albin Prapashtica from 2 Korriku.

On 18 August 2020, On the day of the UEFA Europa League preliminary round match against Gibraltarian side Lincoln Red Imps confirmed eight infected with coronavirus, A few hours after the confirmation, the teams get ready to play and publish the formations, Prishtina published a half formation with many absences and only three substitutes, but the Gibraltarian authorities stopped the match and forced Prishtina to leave the country.

On 19 August 2020, Prishtina announced the signing of Mërgim Pefqeli from Llapi. In same day, UEFA decides on the continuation of the postponed match against Gibraltarian side Lincoln Red Imps, but on the condition that in the composition of the team are players who have not been to Gibraltar. A few hours later, Prishtina announced that with the approval of UEFA loaned 23 players from the Superleague and First League teams, these players would be part of replacement squad that will travel back to Gibraltar.

Squad information

Current squad

Other players under contract

Transfers

In

Out

Loan for European competition matches

Competitions

Overview

Football Superleague of Kosovo

Standings

Matches

UEFA Europa League

References

External links
 

FC Prishtina